In mathematics, Fejér's theorem, named after Hungarian mathematician Lipót Fejér, states the following:

Explanation of Fejér's Theorem's 
Explicitly, we can write the Fourier series of f as
where the nth partial sum of the Fourier series of f may be written as

where the Fourier coefficients  are

Then, we can define

with Fn being the nth order Fejér kernel.

Then, Fejér's theorem asserts that

with uniform convergence. With the convergence written out explicitly, the above statement becomes

Proof of Fejér's Theorem 
We first prove the following lemma:

Using a change of variables we get

This completes the proof of Lemma 1.

We next prove the following lemma:

Proof: Recall the definition of the Fejér Kernel 

As in the case of Lemma 1, we substitute the integral form of the Fourier coefficients into the formula for 

This completes the proof of Lemma 2.

We next prove the 3rd Lemma:

This completes the proof of Lemma 3.

We are now ready to prove Fejér's Theorem. First, let us recall the statement we are trying to prove

We begin by invoking Lemma 2:

By Lemma 3a we know that

Applying the triangle inequality yields

and by Lemma 3b, we get

The motivation for doing so is that we want to prove that . We can do this by proving that each integral above, integral 1 and integral 2, goes to zero. This is precisely what we'll do in the next step.

We first note that the function f is continuous on [-π,π]. We invoke the theorem that every periodic function on [-π,π] that is continuous is also bounded and uniformily continuous. This means that . Hence we can rewrite the integral 1 as follows

Because  and By Lemma 3a we then get for all n

This gives the desired bound for integral 1 which we can exploit in final step.

For integral 2, we note that since f is bounded, we can write this bound as 

We are now ready to prove that . We begin by writing

Thus,By Lemma 3c we know that the integral goes to 0 as n goes to infinity, and because epsilon is arbitrary, we can set it equal to 0. Hence , which completes the proof.

Modifications and Generalisations of Fejér's Theorem 
In fact, Fejér's theorem can be modified to hold for pointwise convergence.

This is because there exist functions whose Fourier series fails to converge at some point. However, the set of points at which a function in  diverges has to be measure zero. This fact, called Lusins conjecture or Carleson's theorem, was proven in 1966 by L. Carleson. We can however prove a corrollary relating which goes as follows:

A more general form of the theorem applies to functions which are not necessarily continuous .  Suppose that f is in L1(-π,π).  If the left and right limits f(x0±0) of f(x) exist at x0, or if both limits are infinite of the same sign, then

Existence or divergence to infinity of the Cesàro mean is also implied.  By a theorem of Marcel Riesz, Fejér's theorem holds precisely as stated if the (C, 1) mean σn is replaced with (C, α) mean of the Fourier series .

References

 .

Fourier series
Theorems in approximation theory